is a Japanese male badminton player.

Achievements

BWF International Challenge/Series
Men's Doubles

 BWF International Challenge tournament
 BWF International Series tournament
 BWF Future Series tournament

References

External links 
 

Living people
1991 births
Sportspeople from Shimane Prefecture
Japanese male badminton players
21st-century Japanese people